Raymond Contrastin (born in Condom, on 5 April 1925 - 1985) was a French rugby league footballer who played in the 1950s. A France international representative winger, he has been inducted into the International Rugby League Hall of Fame.
He started playing rugby union for SA Condom until 1947, before joining RC Roanne XIII, with which he was French champion in 1928 and for Bordeaux XIII, with which he won the 1954 title.
Contrastin featured in the 1951 French rugby league tour of Australia and New Zealand, Les Chanticleers first such tour, during which they lost four of their 28 games.

He played for France during the 1954 Rugby League World Cup, including the final against Great Britain in which he scored a try.

References

1925 births
1985 deaths
France national rugby league team players
French rugby league players
French rugby union players
Sportspeople from Gers
RC Roanne XIII players
Rugby league wingers